Arne Kaijser (born 1950) is a professor emeritus of history of technology at the KTH Royal Institute of Technology in Stockholm, and a former president of the Society for the History of Technology.

Kaijser has published two books in Swedish: Stadens ljus. Etableringen av de första svenska gasverken and I fädrens spår. Den svenska infrastrukturens historiska utveckling och framtida utmaningar, and has co-edited several anthologies. Kaijser is a member of the Royal Swedish Academy of Engineering Sciences since 2007 and also a member of the editorial board of two scientific journals: Journal of Urban Technology and Centaurus. Lately, he has been occupied with the history of Large Technical Systems.

References

External links 
 Homepage
 Extended homepage

1950 births
Living people
20th-century Swedish historians
Academic staff of the KTH Royal Institute of Technology
Members of the Royal Swedish Academy of Engineering Sciences
Historians of science
Historians of technology
Linköping University alumni
21st-century Swedish historians